Empuriabrava Airport (ICAO: code LEAP and 1C respectively) is an aerodrome located in Empuriabrava (Alt Empordà, Girona, Catalonia, Spain), near Castelló d'Empúries at the north of the Costa Brava.

It's a private aerodrome from 1985, where mainly practiced parachuting with trade name Skydive Empuriabrava.

References

External links 
 Data airfields Catalans

Airports in Catalonia